For Dorian is a Canadian short drama film, directed by Rodrigo Barriuso and released in 2012. The film stars Ron Lea as Oliver Baum, the father of a child with Down syndrome (Dylan Harman) who is struggling to come to terms with his son's sexual awakening as gay.

The film premiered in 2012 at the TIFF Bell Lightbox as part of the Ryerson University Film Festival, the annual festival of short films by Ryerson University film students. Its subsequent screenings included the 2013 Slamdance Film Festival and the 2013 Inside Out Film and Video Festival, where it won the juried award for Best Canadian Film, and was co-winner with Antoine Bourges's East Hastings Pharmacy of the Lindalee Tracey Award.

It was subsequently included in Boys on Film 11: We Are Animals, the eleventh volume of Peccadillo Pictures' Boys on Film DVDs of gay-themed short films.

References

External links
 

2012 films
Canadian LGBT-related short films
LGBT-related drama films
2012 LGBT-related films
Down syndrome in film
2010s English-language films
Canadian drama short films
2010s Canadian films